The Gay Street Bridge is a vehicle bridge that crosses the Tennessee River in Knoxville, Tennessee, United States.  Completed in 1898, the  bridge is the oldest of four vehicle bridges connecting Downtown Knoxville with South Knoxville, the other three being the Henley Street Bridge, the James E. "Buck" Karnes Bridge (Alcoa Highway), and the James C. Ford Memorial Bridge.

Design

The bridge is a steel spandrel-braced (cantilever) arched design with a concrete deck. The bridge originally contained trolley tracks, but these were removed in 1938.

History
The first bridge across the Tennessee River at this site was a temporary pontoon bridge built during the American Civil War. It was followed by a permanent bridge with stone supporting piers, built by Union General Ambrose E. Burnside, that was washed away in a flood in March 1867. Knox County built a covered bridge at the site, which opened on May 2, 1875, but it was blown down by a tornado shortly afterward. The county sold the surviving piers and rights-of-way to G. W. Saulpaw, who built a wooden Howe truss bridge at the site in 1880. Saulpaw's bridge stood until 1898, when it was demolished after the completion of the Gay Street Bridge.

The Gay Street Bridge was designed by Charles E. Fowler, chief engineer of the Youngstown Bridge Company of Ohio. Fowler later boasted that he had hastily sketched the bridge's design—which was chosen over three other bids—on the back of an envelope during his train ride to Knoxville to meet with county officials. Construction of the bridge, which was supervised by Fowler, began in 1897. Due to the scarcity of certain building materials during the Spanish–American War, Fowler was forced to modify his original design, and was constantly bickering with Knox County officials over who should pay the extra costs.

The Gay Street Bridge opened to traffic on July 9, 1898. Knox County issued a statement proclaiming the bridge "for the use of all the world except Spain," in reference to the war which had been raging throughout the year. Engineering journals such as Engineering News and Bridge Engineering praised the bridge's combination of safety and aesthetics. Because the 1898 bridge included trolley tracks, its construction accelerated residential development in the Island Home Park area on the south side of the river, which previously had been isolated from downtown Knoxville.

After receiving poor safety ratings, the bridge was extensively repaired in a project that required its closure from  December 2001 to April 2004. Repairs included replacement of rusted pin joints and bearings and replacement of concrete on the bridge deck.

See also
 Volunteer Landing

References

Further reading 

 Gay Street Bridge at Bridgehunter

Buildings and structures in Knoxville, Tennessee
Bridges over the Tennessee River
Bridges completed in 1898
Road bridges in Tennessee
Arch bridges in the United States
Steel bridges in the United States
Cantilever bridges in the United States
Truss bridges in the United States